Chomutice is a municipality and village in Jičín District in the Hradec Králové Region of the Czech Republic. It has about 600 inhabitants.

Administrative parts
Villages of Chomutičky and Obora are administrative parts of Chomutice.

Notable people
Josef Hiršal (1920–2003), writer and poet

References

Villages in Jičín District